Cestroideae (syn. Browallioideae) is a subfamily of the plant family Solanaceae, the nightshades.

It currently contains the three tribes and seven genera, as follows:
 Browallieae Hunz.
 Browallia L.
 Streptosolen (Benth.) Miers
 Cestreae Don
 Cestrum L.
 Sessea Ruiz & Pav.
 Vestia Willd.
 Salpiglossideae (Benth.) Hunz.
 Reyesia Gay
 Salpiglossis Ruiz & Pav.

With the (current) exceptions of the genera Sessea and Reyesia, the subfamily furnishes many colourful garden plants of considerable horticultural merit.

Gallery

References

 
Asterid subfamilies